H. M. Samanpriya Herath (born 3 November 1976) is a Sri Lankan politician, former provincial councillor and Member of Parliament.

Herath was born on 3 November 1976. He was a member of Kuliyapitiya Divisional Council and the North Western Provincial Council. He contested the 2020 parliamentary election as a Sri Lanka People's Freedom Alliance electoral alliance candidate in Kurunegala District and was elected to the Parliament of Sri Lanka.

References

1976 births
Local authority councillors of Sri Lanka
Living people
Members of the 16th Parliament of Sri Lanka
Members of the North Western Provincial Council
Sinhalese politicians
Sri Lankan Buddhists
Sri Lanka People's Freedom Alliance politicians
Sri Lanka Podujana Peramuna politicians
United People's Freedom Alliance politicians